Pernarava (formerly) is a small town in Kėdainiai District Municipality, Kaunas County in central Lithuania. In 2011 it had a population of 232. There are wooden Catholic church of Crucified Jesus (built in 1815), dispensary, school, library, monument for postwar partisans of Kęstutis military district.

History
The toponym Pernarava could be derived from unattested Lithuanian personal name *Pernaras (see similar Pernarauskas, Pernaravičius).

An ancient burial place (of the 1st-13th centuries) and 7 stone axes have been found in Pernarava. The name of Pernarava (as Parvern) has been mentioned the first time in 1371 after this place was devastated by the Teutonic Order. Pernarava manor, okolica and field have been mentioned at 16th century. The first church have been built in 1671. 

At the end of the 19th century Pernarava was a property of Benedykt Tyszkiewicz. There were distillery, nursing home.

During the Soviet era Pernarava was a kolkhoz and selsovet center.

Demography

Images

References

Kėdainiai District Municipality
Towns in Kaunas County